The Château de Saint-Michel-de-Maurienne is a 13th century castle in the commune of Saint-Michel-de-Maurienne Savoie département of France.

Naming 
The castle is known in French records as the Château or Châtel de Saint-Michel, and later as Château sur Saint-Michel. In Latin, its name is Castrum Sancti Michaelis.

Geography 

The ancient castle, of which only a single tower remains, dominates the town of Saint-Michel-de-Maurienne to the east, on the right bank of the River Arc. The location is a rounded hill called Chambarlet.

The castle therefore dominates the town but also an ancient glacial tarn, called Saint-Michel, closed on its downstream side by the glacial remnant of Pas-du-Roc that separates it from Saint-Martin-de-la-Porte, and also closes from the south the access to the valley of Valloirette and the town of Valloire. Finally, it oversees the route leading to the Tarentaise Valley, through the mountain pass of the Encombres and the mountain towns of Beaune and Thyl.

The location is strategic, making it "an important military junction position positioned at the crossing of roads leading to Italy, Tarentaise and Briançonnais".

History

Medieval period 
The castle belonged to the noble family of Saint-Michel. A Lord Guillaume of Saint-Michel was mentioned in approximately 1104. He formed an alliance with the family of Ismidon de La Chambre. In fact, the son of Guillaume of Saint-Michel carried the name Ismidon I of Saint-Michel, in around 1151. Ismidon I had two sons, Pierre and Ismidon II, who were made guarantors of the House of La Chambre in 1153.

The local historian, abbot Félix Bernard, advanced the hypothesis that the Pierre called Maréchal de Savoie, cited around 1190, was the aforementioned Pierre, the elder brother of Ismidon II. According to Bernard, he was the origin of the Mareschal family of Saint-Michel. The lords of Saint-Michel owned the castle until 1295, when the last member died.

The town of Saint-Michel belonged to the House of Savoy in Maurienne and not to the bishops of Maurienne. It was the most important town under their possession before they achieved control over the episcopal city of Saint-Jean-de-Maurienne.

In 1309, the castle came into the possession of the family of Mareschal of Saint-Michel. According to Bernard, that family was then the ancestors of the great viscountal family of the Miolans-Charbonnières-La Chambre. In 1550, the castle was still in the domain of the Mareschals. However, Pierre Mareschal had no heir and his inheritance went to his brother, Jean Balthazard de Duin.

Later history 
François de Bavoz de Saint-Julien was commander of the castle in 1580, having his brother Jean de Bavoz as a deputy.

In 1597, the castle was taken by French troops under Lieutenant-General Lesdiguières.

Ownership 
After that sale, the two brothers formed the branches of the families of the counts of the Val d'Isère (Valdisère) and of the marquis of Marclaz. In 1608, they obtained jurisdiction over the mestralie. In the following year, that sale was canceled by a legal decision, and the duke was granted in compensation the purely honorary title of baron of Saint-Michel. The family pursued a legal action to recover the jurisdiction up until 1620, in the course of which Pierre Mareschal Duyn de la Val d'Isère gave the castle to his brother, Jean-Balthazard. The trial, however, prevented Jean-Balthazard from keeping the honorary title of baron of Saint-Michel.

A few years later, his son, Philibert Mareschal Duin de la Val d'Isère, was made Count of Saint-Michel. Philibert's son was made marquis of Marclaz, but he was usually called, as were his descendants, marquis of Saint-Michel, in reference to his ancestors.

Description 

Vestiges of a round tower from the 13th century.

See also 

List of castles in France

References

Bibliography
 
 
 
 

Saint-Michel-de-Maurienne
Ruined castles in Auvergne-Rhône-Alpes